Omida Hemako Sztutowo has a professional beach soccer team based in Sztutowo, Poland.

Names of the club

Honours

Polish competitions 
Ekstraklasa
 Second place:  2010, 2013, 2014, 2015
 Third place:  2009, 2012

Polish Beach Soccer Cup
 Runner-up: 2011, 2012, 2013, 2014, 2015

Polish Beach Soccer Supercup
 Runner-up: 2011, 2014

Polish Beach Soccer Championships Under-21
 Winners:  2006, 2008, 2009, 2011, 2012, 2013
 Second place:  2010, 2015
 Third place:  2007, 2014

International competitions 
Euro Winners Cup
 1/16: 2015, 2016

External links 
  Owner official site

Nowy Dwór Gdański County
Polish beach soccer clubs